Van der Stel is a Dutch surname. Notable people with the surname include:

Adriaan van der Stel (died 1646), Dutch governor of Mauritius
Arie van der Stel (1894–1986), Dutch cyclist
Simon van der Stel (1639–1712), Dutch colonial governor
Willem Adriaan van der Stel (1664–1733), Dutch colonial governor

Dutch-language surnames